Carrothers  is an unincorporated community in Venice Township, Seneca County, Ohio, United States. It is located along State Route 4, just north of the border between Seneca and Crawford County. The community is served by the Attica (44807) post office.

History
Carrothers was platted in 1873 by James Carrothers, and named for him. A post office was established at Carrothers in 1874.

References

Unincorporated communities in Ohio
Unincorporated communities in Seneca County, Ohio